The Republic of Vietnam competed as Vietnam at the 1964 Summer Olympics in Tokyo, Japan. 16 competitors, all men, took part in 14 events in 5 sports.

Athletics

Cycling

Six cyclists represented Vietnam in 1964.

 Individual road race
 Phạm Văn Sau
 Trần Văn Nen
 Nguyễn Văn Khoi
 Nguyễn Văn Ngan

 Team time trial
 Huỳnh Anh
 Nguyễn Văn Khoi
 Nguyễn Văn Ngan
 Trần Văn Nen

 Sprint
 Nguyễn Văn Châu

 1000m time trial
 Trần Văn Nen

 Individual pursuit
 Trần Văn Nen

Fencing

Two fencers represented Vietnam in 1964.

Men's épée
 Trần Văn Xuan

Men's sabre
 Nguyễn The Loc
 Trần Văn Xuan

Judo

Three judoka represented Vietnam in the 1964

Men's Lightweight
 Nguyễn Văn Bình

Men's Middleweight
 Lê Bả Thành
 Thai Thuc Thuan

Swimming

 Phan Huu Dong 
 Le Dinh Nguyen — participant ( no ranking)

References

External links
Official Olympic Reports

Nations at the 1964 Summer Olympics
1964
1964 in Vietnam